Syritta flaviventris is a species of syrphid fly in the family Syrphidae.

Distribution
Madagascar, Southern Europe. Introduced to Chile, Brazil, United States, Mexico.

References

Eristalinae
Diptera of Africa
Diptera of Europe
Taxa named by Pierre-Justin-Marie Macquart
Insects described in 1842
Hoverflies of North America